Riverside Cemetery is located in Oshkosh, Wisconsin and was listed on the U.S. National Register of Historic Places in 2003.

Founding and expansion of cemetery
On March 6, 1855, the city of Oshkosh purchased a land parcel from Maria Grignon for creation of a cemetery. The parcel was located on the east bank of the Fox River and was named Riverside Cemetery. It was built as a replacement for the Locust Grove Cemetery, which was the first burial ground in Oshkosh and built in 1848. Between 1855 and 1869, the remains of those buried in Locust Grove were moved to Riverside Cemetery.

In 1855, the Riverside Catholic cemetery was laid out north of the cemetery and expanded further in 1875. In 1868, a parcel was purchased east of the Riverside Cemetery by Masons. In 1882, the city purchased  in the north edge of the Catholic plots. In 1887, the city sold off  to the Catholic Church.

Landmarks
 Burr/End of the Trail Monument – erected by John Burr in 1929, the monument depicts an American Indian and his weary horse. It is an interpretation of James Fraser's sculpture ''End of the Trail.
 Grand Army of the Republic (G.A.R.) Memorial – erected in 1894, memorial to the Grand Army of the Republic.
 Riverside Cemetery Gateway – erected around 1930, Rustic-style gateway.
 Soldier and Sailor Monument – erected in 1924, 40-foot granite obelisk dedicated to veterans of the Spanish–American War and World War I.

Notable burials
 Thomas Allen (1825–1905), Secretary of State of Wisconsin and Wisconsin Assemblyman
 George Rex Andrews (1808–1873), U.S. Representative from New York
 Lyman E. Barnes (1855–1904), lawyer and U.S. Representative from Wisconsin
 Charles R. Boardman (1860–1950), Adjutant General of Wisconsin and American general in World War I
 Gabriel Bouck (1828–1904), Attorney General of Wisconsin and U.S. Representative from Wisconsin.
 Charles Frederick Burgess (1873–1945), University of Wisconsin professor, pioneer of electrochemical engineering
 James H. Davidson (1858–1918), lawyer and U.S. Representative from Wisconsin
 Edward Eastman (1806–1870), mayor of Oshkosh and Wisconsin Assemblyman
 George Fitch (1848–1896), Wisconsin State Senator
 Richard W. Guenther (1945–1913), Treasurer of Wisconsin and U.S. Representative from Wisconsin.
 Florian Lampert (1963–1930), U.S. Representative from Wisconsin
 Lucas M. Miller (1924–1902), U.S. Representative from Wisconsin
 Charles Rahr (1865–1925), Wisconsin Assemblyman and owner of Rahr Brewing Company
 Christian Sarau (1839–1903), Wisconsin Assemblyman and State Senator
 Philetus Sawyer (1816–1900), U.S. Senator and U.S. Representative from Wisconsin
 Ganem W. Washburn (1823–1907), Wisconsin State Senator and judge
 Edwin Wheeler (1828–1864), Wisconsin State Senator and judge

References

External links
Official website
Catholic Cemeteries of Oshkosh

Cemeteries in Wisconsin
Buildings and structures in Oshkosh, Wisconsin
National Register of Historic Places in Winnebago County, Wisconsin
Cemeteries on the National Register of Historic Places in Wisconsin
Protected areas of Winnebago County, Wisconsin